Love Shaft is a British speed-dating game show broadcast on E4. It is presented by Will Best and narrated by Maria McErlane.

References

External links

Channel 4

2012 British television series debuts
2012 British television series endings
British dating and relationship reality television series
2010s British game shows
Channel 4 game shows
Channel 4 reality television shows
E4 (TV channel) original programming
English-language television shows